Yuriy Semyonovich Konovalov (30 December 1929 – 25 May 2008) was a Soviet sprinter. He competed at the 1956 and 1960 Olympics in the 100 m, 200 m and 4×100 m relay events and won two silver medals, both in the relay. He also won a bronze medal in the relay at the 1958 European Championships. Domestically he won two titles, in the 100 m in 1957, and in the 200 m in 1958.

References

1929 births
2008 deaths
Sportspeople from Baku
Azerbaijani male sprinters
Soviet male sprinters
Olympic silver medalists for the Soviet Union
Athletes (track and field) at the 1956 Summer Olympics
Athletes (track and field) at the 1960 Summer Olympics
Olympic athletes of the Soviet Union
European Athletics Championships medalists
Medalists at the 1960 Summer Olympics
Medalists at the 1956 Summer Olympics
Olympic silver medalists in athletics (track and field)